Beloved Rogues is a 1917 American silent comedy-drama film directed and written by Alfred Santell with the storyline by Aaron Hoffman. It starred C. William Kolb.

A surviving fragment, 1 reel, exists at the Library of Congress.

Plot
The film is about a business deal involving a personal endowment.

Cast
C. William Kolb ....  Louie Vanderiff
Max M. Dill ....  Mike Amsterdammer
May Cloy ....  Madge
Clarence Burton ....  Jack Kennedy
Harry von Meter ....  Andrews
Tom Chatterton

References

External links

1917 films
1917 comedy-drama films
1910s English-language films
American silent feature films
American black-and-white films
Films directed by Alfred Santell
American Film Company films
Lost American films
1917 lost films
Lost comedy-drama films
1910s American films
Silent American comedy-drama films